Brady Boyd (Born January 11, 1967, Logansport, Louisiana) is the senior pastor of New Life Church in Colorado Springs, Colorado.

Boyd finished Simsboro High School in 1985 and graduated from Louisiana Tech University in 1989 with a degree in journalism. He has worked as a high school English teacher, basketball coach and sports broadcaster. Boyd has been married to Pam Boyd since August 12, 1989, and has two children: Abram, born in 1998, and Callie, born 2000. He was a lay leader at Trinity Fellowship in Amarillo, Texas from 1997 to 1998 and the senior pastor of Trinity Fellowship Church in Hereford, Texas from 1998 to 2001. In March 2001, he became associate senior pastor at Gateway Church in Southlake, Texas under Pastor Robert Morris. He became the senior pastor of New Life Church in August 2007, after the resignation of Ted Haggard, where he continues to lead today.

Books
 Oceans of Grace: A Year of Devotions Celebrating 15 Years of God's Goodness (2022) ISBN 979-8840477373
 Extravagant: Discovering a Life of Dangerous Generosity (2020) ISBN 1-9821-0140-7
Remarkable: Living a Faith Worth Talking About (2019) 
Speak Life (2016) 
 Addicted to Busy (2014) 
 Let Her Lead (2013) 
 Sons and Daughters: Spiritual Orphans Finding Our Way Home (2012) 
 Fear No Evil (2011)

References

External links 
 Official Website of New Life Church
 denverpost.com
 denverpost.com

1967 births
Living people
American evangelicals
American evangelists
Louisiana Tech University alumni
People from Logansport, Louisiana